Tunisia (TUN) competed at the 1971 Mediterranean Games in Izmir, Turkey.

Nations at the 1971 Mediterranean Games
1971
Mediterranean Games